Jesse Huta Galung was the defending champion, but chose to compete at the 2014 Dubai Tennis Championships instead.
Kenny de Schepper won the title, defeating Norbert Gomboš in the final, 3–6, 6–2, 6–3.

Seeds

Draw

Finals

Top half

Bottom half

References
 Main Draw
 Qualifying Draw

Challenger La Manche - Singles
2014 Singles